Kandry-Kul (Qandrakül) is a rural locality (a village) in Bizhbulyaksky Selsoviet, Bizhbulyaksky District, Bashkortostan, Russia. The population was 131 as of 2010. There are 2 streets.

Geography 
Kandry-Kul is located 5 km west of Bizhbulyak (the district's administrative centre) by road. Bizhbulyak is the nearest rural locality.

References 

Rural localities in Bizhbulyaksky District